Purfleet Rifle Range was a railway station on the London, Tilbury and Southend Railway. It was opened for military use in 1911 and public use in 1921 and closed in 1948. It was located between Purfleet and Rainham railway stations.

References

Disused railway stations in Essex
Former London, Tilbury and Southend Railway stations
Railway stations in Great Britain opened in 1911
Railway stations in Great Britain closed in 1948